Kedleston is a civil parish in the Amber Valley district of Derbyshire, England. The parish contains 19 listed buildings that are recorded in the National Heritage List for England. Of these, four are listed at Grade I, the highest of the three grades, eight are at Grade II*, the middle grade, and the others are at Grade II, the lowest grade.  The parish contains the village of Kedleston and the surrounding area.  The major building in the parish is Kedleston Hall, which is listed together with associated structures, including a church, and buildings in the gardens and surrounding park.  The listed buildings outside the park are a rectory, a smithy converted into a private house, and a milepost.


Key

Buildings

References

Citations

Sources

 

Lists of listed buildings in Derbyshire